The United States Chief Technology Officer (US CTO) is an official in the Office of Science and Technology Policy. The U.S. CTO helps the President and their team harness the power of data, innovation and technology on behalf of the American people. The CTO works closely with others both across and outside government on a broad range of work including utilizing technology to improve the government and its services, while supporting national interests through the promotion of technological innovation. Specifically, the CTO uses applied technology to help create jobs, create paths to improve government services with lower costs, higher quality and increased transparency, help upgrade agencies to use open data and expand their data science capabilities, improve quality and reduce the costs of health care and criminal justice, increase access to broadband, bring technical talent into government for policy and modern operations input, improve community innovation engagement by agencies working on local challenges, and help keep the nation secure.

History 
During the 2008 presidential campaign, Senator Barack Obama stated that he would appoint the first federal chief technology officer if elected to the presidency. Aneesh Chopra was named by President Obama as the nation's first CTO in April 2009, and confirmed by the Senate on August 7, 2009. Chopra resigned effective February 8, 2012, and was succeeded by Todd Park, formerly the CTO of the Department of Health and Human Services. On September 4, 2014 Megan Smith was named as the CTO. After leaving the role vacant for two years, President Trump named Michael Kratsios as U.S. CTO in May 2019, and he was unanimously confirmed by the United States Senate on August 1, 2019.

Notes 
1. Only Aneesh Chopra and Michael Kratsios were confirmed by the Senate. Todd Park and Megan Smith were not.

See also
Chief Information Officer of the United States
Chief Technology Officer of the Department of Health and Human Services

References

Office of Science and Technology Policy
American chief technology officers
Technology evangelists
Science and technology in the United States
2009 establishments in the United States
Agencies of the United States government